The grand duke of Vladimir, or grand prince of Vladimir was the monarch of Vladimir-Suzdal during the era of Kievan Rus' and after its collapse.

Overview 
The monarch of Vladimir-Suzdal's title, veliky knyaz or velikii kniaz is variously translated into English as "grand duke" or "grand prince". Consequently, Vladimir-Suzdal has been interchangeably described as a "grand principality" or "grand duchy".

Vladimir-Suzdal emerged from the Principality of Rostov. The grand prince of Vladimir ruled a territory approximately bounded by three rivers, the Volga, the Oka and the Northern Dvina. Yuri Dolgorukiy, the seventh son of Vladimir Monomakh, began the lineage of the princes of Suzdal' and Vladimir-Suzdal'. From 1157 to 1238 its capital was Vladimir, which had been founded by the Kievan prince Vladimir Monomakh in 1108. In 1151 Andrey Bogolyubsky secretly left Vyshgorod, the domain of his father in the Principality of Kiev, and migrated to Suzdal. In 1157 he became grand prince of the principalities of Vladimir, Suzdal and Rostov. After sacking Kiev in 1169, Andrey Bogolyubsky claimed to be a grand prince.

The city of Vladimir was destroyed by a Mongol invasion in 1238. The second important city, Suzdal', was also destroyed by Mongols. The entire principality was then overrun by the Mongols, under Batu Khan, in 1242. He and his successors asserted suzerainty over it until 1328. During this period Vladimir became the chief town of the Rus' settlements in the basin of the Oka and it clashed with the new principality of Moscow, to which it finally succumbed in 1328. It began to decay in the 14th century.

The state of Vladimir-Suzdal (formally the Grand Duchy of Vladimir) became dominant among the various petty principalities formed after the dissolution of the Kievan Rus' state. The title of Grand Duke of Vladimir became one of the three titles (along with Kiev and Novgorod) possessed by the most important rulers among the Russian nobility. Vladimir enjoyed hegemony for a time, but it too disintegrated into a series of petty states, the most important of which became the Grand Duchy of Moscow, which itself eventually evolved into the Tsardom of Russia.

In the 14th century, Vladimir-Suzdal had splintered into various appanage principalities including Nizhny Novgorod (Novogord-Suzdal), Tver and Moscow (Muscovy) who all claimed the title of Grand Prince of Vladimir, and sought to gain the favour of the Tatar-Mongol khan of the Golden Horde to secure it. In the early 14th century, the khan awarded the title to Yury of Moscow to counterbalance the strength of Tver; and after the Tver Uprising of 1327, which the Muscovites helped put down, Özbeg Khan named Ivan "Kalita" of Moscow the new grand prince of Vladimir. By the mid-14th century and especially during the 1360s "Great Troubles" for the Golden Horde, the khan's alliance with Moscow made the latter militarily and administratively powerful enough to economically and demographically devastate its rivals, notably Tver. The khans therefore started awarding the grand princely title to Moscow's rivals; in 1353,  of Nizhny Novgorod-Suzdal unsuccessfully tried to obtain the title of grand prince of Vladimir, and in 1371 it was awarded to Mikhail II of Tver. But by that time it was too late for the Golden Horde to curb the rise of Muscovy. Tokhtamysh allowed Vasily I of Moscow to succeed his father Dmitry Donskoy as grand prince of Vladimir in 1389.

List

See also 
 Grand Prince of Kiev
 Prince of Tver

Notes

References

Bibliography 
  (e-book).

Vladimir